Teas or TEAS can mean:

 Tea, a traditional beverage made from steeping the processed leaves, buds, or twigs of the tea bush (Camellia sinensis) in water.
 Test of Essential Academic Skills, a standardized aptitude test used for entrance to nursing schools
  Thermal energy atom scattering, a physics technique, see Helium atom scattering
 Trademark Electronic Application System at United States Patent and Trademark Office
 The Eric Andre Show, an Adult Swim television series
 The European Azerbaijan Society
 Trans European Asia System, a planned submarine communications cable